André Castelot, born André Storms (23 January 1911, Antwerp – 18 July 2004, Neuilly-sur-Seine), was a French writer and scriptwriter born in Belgium. He was the son of the Symbolist painter Maurice Chabas and Gabrielle Storms-Castelot (née Gabrielle Alice Castelot), and the brother of the film actor Jacques Castelot. He wrote more than one hundred books, mostly biographies of famous people.

Books

 Napoleon 
 Queen of France, A Biography of Marie Antoinette 
 Josephine 
 King Louis XVI
 Paris: the Turbulent City 1783–1871
 King of Rome: A Biography of Napoleon's Tragic Son
 Fouché

Adaptations 
 Napoleon II, the Eagle  (1961, film)

French male screenwriters
20th-century French screenwriters
1911 births
2004 deaths
Commanders of the Ordre national du Mérite
French male non-fiction writers
20th-century French male writers